SC Pfullendorf is a German sports club based in Pfullendorf, Baden-Württemberg. The 700-member club is best known for its football department, but also has departments for chess, table tennis and ice stock sport, a winter sport similar to curling.

History

The club was founded on 2 August 1919, as part of the gymnastics club TV Pfullendorf. It became independent in 1921 under the name SC Pfullendorf and was officially registered as a club on 25 February 1924.

After World War II was renamed SV Pfullendorf and played eight matches under this name in the 1945–46 season of the amateur Einheitsklasse Bodensee/Schwarzwald league. The club was then disbanded, but promptly reorganized as FC Pfullendorf on 21 September 1946, and re-claimed the name SC Pfullendorf, on 23 June 1950.

Throughout the 1950s, 60s and 70s, Pfullendorf competed as a fourth or fifth division side until breaking through to the Amateurliga Südbaden (III) in 1976 on the strength of a championship in the 2nd Amateurliga Südbaden-Süd (IV). The club's first German Cup appearance followed in 1978 when they were put out in the first round by Second Bundesliga side FC Homburg.

SCP spent thirteen seasons in third division football between 1976 and 1994, playing largely as a lower table side. Their best result at that level was a fifth-place finish in 1993 in what had become the Amateur Oberliga Baden-Württemberg (III).

During this period Pfullendorf made a trio of German Cup appearances. In 1980–81, they beat Blumenthaler SV 2:0 in the first round before going out 0:1 to SV Siegburg in the second round. Their next two turns resulted in early exits from the competition. In 1983–84, they were thrashed 0:7 by Bundesliga side Eintracht Braunschweig, and in 1990–91 lost to 2. Bundesliga club MSV Duisburg.

The second half of the 90s was difficult for the club as they slipped to the Verbandsliga Südbaden in 1994 and then spent the next three seasons toiling in the Oberliga Baden-Württemberg (IV). Pfullendorf returned to the Regionalliga Süd for the 1998–99 season where, despite being a tough opponent, they finished in 16th place with a +1 goal differential and appeared headed for relegation. However, division winner Kickers Offenbach played their way into the 2nd Bundesliga leaving room for SCP to stay up. The following season was even more exciting for supporters as the club began winning the close matches it had dropped the year before and rocketed to a second-place finish. This earned an appearance in the promotion round for the second division where they drew 1:1 with LR Ahlen and lost 1:3 to Union Berlin.

The next year the club collapsed and was relegated to the Oberliga Baden-Württemberg (IV) after finishing in 17th place. Their fifth German Cup appearance then ended in the first round at the hands of the Bundesliga's SC Freiburg.

However, Pfullendorf quickly bounced back to third division play in 2002. After earning a pair of mid-table finishes in the Regionalliga Süd (III), the club has flirted with relegation in its past two campaigns and would have been sent down after a 16th-place result in 2005 if not for 14th-place finisher 1. SC Feucht not seeking a license.

The club managed to surprise Bundesliga side Arminia Bielefeld 2–1 in their first round German Cup match up on 10 September 2006 marking the first time Pfullendorf has defeated a professional side in the competition. They were subsequently put out 0–2 by 2nd Bundesliga club Kickers Offenbach in late October.

After ten consecutive seasons in the Regionalliga Süd at the end of the 2011–12 season the club was grouped into the new Regionalliga Südwest, which replaced the Regionalliga Süd in the region. SC played at this level for two seasons before being relegated after finishing last in the league in 2014. After finishing 11th in the Oberliga in 2014–15 the club came last in 2015–16 and was relegated to the Verbandsliga.

Reserve team
The SC Pfullendorf II played in the Verbandsliga Südbaden for seven consecutive season, having reached this league level in 1999 for the first time, but suffered relegation to the Landesliga in 2011.

Stadium
SC Pfullendorf plays in the Waldstadion an der Kasernenstraße (capacity 10,000). In recent years, the facility has been known under a sponsorship agreement as the Geberit-Arena.

Current squad

Honours
The club's honours:

League
 Regionalliga Süd (III)
 Runners-up: 2000
 Oberliga Baden-Württemberg (IV)
 Champions: 2002
 Verbandsliga Südbaden (IV)
 Champions: (5) 1980, 1982, 1988, 1990, 1995
 Landesliga Südbaden 3
 Champions: 2004‡

Cup
 South Baden Cup (Tiers III-VII)
 Winners: (5) 1983, 1990, 2006, 2008, 2010
 Runners-up: 2007

 ‡ Won by reserve team.

Recent managers
Recent managers of the club:

Recent seasons
The recent season-by-season performance of the club:

SC Pfullendorf

SC Pfullendorf II

 With the introduction of the Regionalligas in 1994 and the 3. Liga in 2008 as the new third tier, below the 2. Bundesliga, all leagues below dropped one tier. In 2012, the number of Regionalligas was increased from three to five with all Regionalliga Süd clubs except the Bavarian ones entering the new Regionalliga Südwest.

References

External links
 Official website
 Abseits Guide to German Soccer
 SC Pfullendorf at Weltfussball.de
 Das deutsche Fußball-Archiv historical German domestic league tables 

Football clubs in Germany
Football clubs in Baden-Württemberg
Association football clubs established in 1919
1919 establishments in Germany
Sport in Tübingen (region)